Dejan Cukić (born November 4, 1959) is a Serbian rock musician, journalist, writer and translator.

During the late 1970s and early 1980s, Cukić was the frontman of the new wave band Bulevar, releasing two albums with the band. After Bulevar disbanded in 1982, he dedicated himself to journalism. He returned to music in 1984, when he became one of the vocalists of the rock/pop rock band Bajaga i Instruktori, with which he recorded three studio albums. In 1987, he released his first solo album, and soon after left Bajaga i Instruktori to pursue solo career, which spans to the present day. In 1988, Cukić formed his backing band, Spori Ritam Band.

Musical career

Bulevar (1978–1982)

As a teenager Dejan Cukić was the singer of the band Dizel. After leaving Dizel, he joined Tilt, and later the new wave band Bulevar. Cukić released two albums with Bulevar: Loš i mlad (Bad and Young) and Mala noćna panika (A Little Night Panic). After Bulevar disbanded in 1982, Cukić started working as a journalist.

Bajaga i Instruktori (1984–1988)

In 1984, Cukić became a member of Bajaga i Instruktori. He recorded three albums with Bajaga i Instruktori: Pozitivna geografija (Positive Geography), Sa druge strane jastuka (On the Other Side of the Pillow) and Jahači magle (Fog Riders). In the spring of 1987, he released his first solo album, Spori ritam (Slow Rhythm). The album was recorded with Safet Petrovac and Vlada Negovanović on guitar, Branko Isaković on bass guitar, Dragoljub Đuričić on drums, and Cukić's bandmate from Bajaga i Instruktori Saša Lokner on keyboards, and produced by Saša Habić. The album featured a cover of Azra's song "A šta da radim" ("What Should I Do"). During the summer of the same year, Cukić went on Bajaga i Instruktori Soviet Union tour, which was his last tour with the band.

Solo career (1988 – present)
In 1988, he formed his backing band, Spori Ritam Band (Slow Rhythm Band). The first lineup of the band featured Dragan Mitrić (keyboards), Vlada Negovanović (a former Doktor Spira i Ljudska Bića and Tunel member, guitar), Safet Petrovac (a former Piloti member, guitar), Slobodan Jurišić (a former Mama Co Co and Točak Band member, drums), and Branko Isaković (a former Bulevar, Suncokret and Idoli member, bass guitar). In 1989, Isaković moved to Kerber, and was replaced by Bata Božanić. This lineup recorded the album Zajedno (Together). The title track was a cover of The Beatles' song "Come Together". Soon after the album release, Petrovac and Božanić left the band, and Božanić was replaced by former Jugosloveni member Nenad Novaković. In 1991, both Isaković and Petrovac returned to the band. Album 1991 was during the same year. It featured a cover of Bulevar's song "Nestašni dečaci" ("Wild Boys"). At the time, the Yugoslav wars started, and Cukić made a three-year break in his work.

In 1994, Cukić released a compilation album San na pola puta (A Dream on the Half of the Road), which featured several songs which did not appear on his studio albums: a cover of Arsen Dedić's song "Sve što znaš o meni" ("Everything You Know about Me"), cover of Bulevar's song "Trenutni lek" ("Momentary Remedy") and the ballad "Ruža ispod pepela" ("Rose under the Ashes"), the latter previously released on the various artist album S one strane duge (Over the Rainbow). In 1994, Cukić performed at the unplugged festival held in Sava Centar, and an unplugged version of the song "Ruža ispod pepela" was released on the live album Bez struje (Unplugged). At the end of 1995, Negovanović left Spori Ritam Band and became a member of Bajaga i Instruktori, but he continued to occasionally work with Cukić.

The album 4 ½... Ja bih da pevam... (4 ½... I Would Like to Sing...) was released in 1996. It featured a cover of Đorđe Marjanović's song "Zvižduk u osam" ("Whistle at Eight") and a cover of Doobie Brothers' song "Long Train Running", Cukić version titled "Dugo putovanje vozom". The song "Mokre ulice" ("Wet Streets") featured Branimir Štulić on vocals as guest. In 1997, Dejan Cukić and Spori Ritam Band released the live album Unplugged recorded on their unplugged concert in Studio M in Novi Sad. In 1996, Cukić and Spori Ritam Band also performed on Music Festival Budva, playing the song "Na moru ljubavi" ("On the Sea of Love"), and in 1997, they performed at the same festival playing the song "Karneval" ("Carnival"). At the end of 1998, they released the album Igramo na ulici (Dancing in the Street).

In 2000, Cukić wrote Serbian language lyrics for Bob Dylan's songs to be used in the theatre play Divlji med (Wild Honey) played in Atelje 212. These covers were released on the album Divlji med – Pesme Boba Dilana (Wild Honey – Bob Dylan Songs). In 2002, Cukić released the studio album Kalendar ("Calendar"). The album featured guest appearances by Teodora Bojović (on the track "U snovima"), Riblja Čorba guitarist Vidoja Božinović (on the tracks "Marina" and the cover of Rolling Stones' "(I Can't Get No) Satisfaction"), Vladimir Barjaktarević and Bora Đorđević of Riblja Čorba and Momčilo Bajagić and Žika Milenković of Bajaga i Instruktori (on "(I Can't Get No) Satisfaction"). Along with "(I Can't Get No) Satisfaction", The Beatles' "Strawberry Fields Forever" was covered as a bonus track. In 2003, backed with Spori Ritam Band, Cukić recorded a live album in Belgrade's Sava Centar and released it as DC & SRB @ SC (short of Dejan Cukić & Spori Ritam Band at Sava Centar).

In 2007, after a four-year break, Cukić presented his new single "Kud me vetar doziva" (Where the Wind Calls Me) at Music Festival Budva, which he announced his new studio album. The album was released on April 1, 2008 with a symbolic title Ubrzanje! (Acceleration!). The album featured several producers: Mirko Vukomanović, Vlada Negovanović, Voja Aralica, Ted Yanni, Predrag M. Milanović and Kornelije Kovač. Like on the previous album, two bonus cover versions appeared: Azra's hit "Obrati pažnju na poslednju stvar" ("Pay Attention to the Last Tune") and a different version of Bob Dylan's "Forever Young" (as "Zauvek mlad") than the one appearing on Divlji med – Pesme Boba Dilana album.

In 2014, Cukić released the compilation album Priče o ljubavi (Stories About Love), in order to celebrate 25 years of solo career. The album featured two new songs, "Prava ljubav" ("True Love") and "Priča o ljubavi" ("Story about Love"), the latter written by Nikola Čuturilo.

In July 2017, Dejan Cukić the single "Od šanka do šanka" ("From Bar to Bar"), a cover of song by singer-songwriter Andrej Šifrer. It was announced that the song is the first of several singles which would be released during the year in order to mark 30 years of Cukić's solo career.

Career as a journalist
After Bulevar disbanded in 1982, Cukić started working in the Rock magazine and other Politika publications, where he published his interviews with Dire Straits, Uriah Heep, Saxon, Tina Turner, Sting, Kim Wilde, Cheap Trick, Matchbox, Yazoo, Samson, Gap Band and others. By his own words, he decided to return to music after an interview with Bananarama members in 1984, after which he joined Bajaga i Instruktori.

At the end of 1996, Cukić started writing about Serbian rock scene for Beocity.com website. In the spring of 2001, Cukić became one of the editors of the Žica magazine.

In 2011, he became the host of Radio B92 show Volim ponedeljak (I Like Monday). In 2013, he became the host of Radio Laguna show Nedelja veče sa Dejanom Cukićem (Sunday Evening with Dejan Cukić).

During the 2000s and early 2010s he occasionally contributed to the Politikin Zabavnik magazine.

Literary and translating career
In 2001, Cukić published a book about life and work of Frank Zappa, entitled Muzika je najbolja (Music Is the Best). His book  (The Rolling Stones – the Manual) was published in 2007. The book entitled 45 obrtaja: Priče o pesmama (45 Revolutions: Stories about Songs), compiled of his articles published in Politikin Zabavnik, was published during the same year.

In 2008, Cukić started to collaborate with the publishing house Laguna, translating several biographical works into Serbian: in 2008, he translated Eric Clapton's The Autobiography; in 2009, he translated Steve Mallins' Depeche Mode: Black Celebration: The Biography; in 2010, he translated Mick Wall's When Giants Walked the Earth: A Biography of Led Zeppelin; in 2011, he translated Marc Spitz's Bowie: A Biography and, together with Goran Skorobonja, Keith Richards' Life; in 2013, he translated Christopher Andersen's Mick: The Wild Life and Mad Genius of Jagger.

Other activities
In 1986, Cukić played one of the main characters in the TV drama Poslednja priča (The Last Story) directed by Miloš Petrović. He appeared in TV rock opera Kreatori i kreature (Creators and Creatures) directed by Vladimir Milančić.

In 2011, Cukić became a contestant in the TV Pink reality show Dvor (The Castle), which caused mostly negative reactions by the rock community in Serbia. He was voted out of the show after four weeks.

Legacy
In 2011, Cukić's version of the song "A šta da radim" was polled, by the listeners of Radio 202, one of 60 greatest songs released by PGP-RTB/PGP-RTS during the sixty years of the label's existence.

Discography

With Bulevar
see Bulevar discography

With Bajaga i Instruktori

Studio albums
 Pozitivna geografija (1984)
 Sa druge strane jastuka (1985)
 Jahači magle (1986)

Solo

Studio albums
 Spori ritam (1987)
 Zajedno (1989)
 1991 (1991)
 4 ½... Ja bih da pevam... (1996)
 Igramo na ulici (1998)
 Divlji med – Pesme Boba Dilana (2000)
 Kalendar (2002)
 Ubrzanje! (2008)

Live albums
 Unplugged (1997)
 DC & SRB @ SC (2003)

Compilation albums
 San na pola puta (1992)
Priče o ljubavi (2014)

Other appearances
"Ruža ispod pepela" (S one strane duge, 1992)
"Ruža ispod pepela" (Bez struje, 1994)

References 

Dejan Cukić at Discogs
 EX YU ROCK enciklopedija 1960–2006, Janjatović Petar;

External links 
Dejan Cukić at Discogs

Serbian rock singers
Serbian singer-songwriters
Serbian journalists
Serbian non-fiction writers
Yugoslav rock singers
Yugoslav male singers
Musicians from Belgrade
Living people
1959 births